The Bork3D Game Engine is a C++ open source game engine developed by Bork 3D LLC for use on mobile device platforms, primarily targeting iPhone and iPad. Several iOS games have announced their use of it, most notably from Bioroid Studios, Simiula, and Bork 3D itself.

The game engine uses OpenGL and OpenGL ES for rendering, and OpenAL for audio. Originally sold under a commercial license, it is free open source software distributed under a permissive BSD-style license.

Major features 

 SDK runs on iOS, Mac OS X and Windows
 Tool pipeline supports Collada, 3dsmax and Maya
 Integrated web server
 Data-driven UI system

Games 
 Quoridor: An adaptation of the board game of the same name for iPhone

References 

Free game engines
IPhone video game engines
MacOS games
Windows games
Software using the BSD license